Segonbad ("Three Gonbads") is a historical structure located in the town of Urmia, in northwest Iran.  The monument has three inscriptions in the Kufic script placed on the entrance door. Segonbad is a remnant of the Seljuk period.

Building 
The current building has two floors and there are vents on all four sides. The first floor is called the crypt, which has an arched cover and is thus separated from the second floor.

References

External links
 Tishineh

Monuments and memorials in Iran
Buildings and structures in Urmia
Persian words and phrases
Seljuk architecture